John Flett Duthie (7 January 1903 — 1969) was a Scottish professional footballer who played as a wing half.

Career
Born in Fraserburgh, Duthie began his career with his local side Fraserburgh Town before joining  Football League side Hartlepool United in 1922. He was unable to break into the first team, making no appearances, and returned to Scotland to play for Clydebank. He rejoined Hartlepool the following season and made his debut on 10 November 1923 in a 0–0 draw with New Brighton. He made three further appearances, scoring once in a 10–1 victory over St Peter's Albion in the FA Cup, before leaving the club at the end of the season.

He joined Cardiff City in 1933 but the club endured a difficult season, finishing bottom of the  Third Division South, and he was released. He later played for Welsh league side Caerau and Midland Football League side Peterborough United.

References

1903 births
1969 deaths
Scottish footballers
Hartlepool United F.C. players
Clydebank F.C. (1914) players
Norwich City F.C. players
Queens Park Rangers F.C. players
York City F.C. players
Crystal Palace F.C. players
Crewe Alexandra F.C. players
Aberdeen F.C. players
Workington A.F.C. players
Cardiff City F.C. players
Peterborough United F.C. players
English Football League players
Association football wing halves